Robert Harward (by 1482 – 1533/1534) was an English politician.

He was Mayor of Leicester for 1521–22 and elected a Member (MP) of the Parliament of England for Leicester in 1529.

On his death in office as MP he was buried in St. Martin's church, Leicester. He had married Margaret, the daughter of John Wigston of Leicester, and had 2 sons and a daughter.

References

 

15th-century births
1534 deaths
English MPs 1529–1536
Mayors of places in Leicestershire